The 2022 Kirin Cup Soccer was the 33rd edition of the international friendly football tournament Kirin Cup Soccer organised by the Japan Football Association, which was played in Japan between 10 and 14 June 2022, with the participation of four teams: Japan, Chile, Ghana and Tunisia.

This is the first Kirin Cup tournament in six years, since the 2016 edition. Tunisia have won their first title, defeating Japan 3–0 in the final. Ferjani Sassi was named the best player of the tournament while his compatriot Issam Jebali finished as the top scorer with two goals.

Teams 
The following teams participated for the tournament.

Venues

Results 
All times are local, Japan Standard Time (UTC+9).

Bracket

Semi-finals

Third place match

Final

Statistics

Final standings 
Per statistical convention in football, matches decided in extra time are counted as wins and losses, while matches decided by a penalty shoot-out are counted as draws.

|}

Goalscorers

Awards 

 Best player:  Ferjani Sassi
 Top scorer:  Issam Jebali

See also 
 Kirin Challenge Cup (an international friendly match)
 Kirin Company (supporting company)
 Japan Football Association (JFA)

References

External links 
 Kirin Cup Soccer 2022 
 Kirin Cup Soccer 2022 

Kirin Cup
International association football competitions hosted by Japan
Japanese football friendly trophies
International men's association football invitational tournaments
Japan national football team
Recurring sporting events established in 1978
k|
Annual sporting events